Great Notch is an unincorporated community located in eastern Little Falls, in Passaic County, New Jersey, United States. It gets its name from a gap in the first of the Watchung Mountains. Located in Great Notch are parts of Montclair State University and the Great Notch Fire Company.

With fewer than 10 passengers boarding per weekday, NJ Transit ended service at the Great Notch train station in January 2010.

Demographics

References

Little Falls, New Jersey
Unincorporated communities in Passaic County, New Jersey
Unincorporated communities in New Jersey